
Gmina Ozimek is an urban-rural gmina (administrative district) in Opole County, Opole Voivodeship, in south-western Poland.

Villages
Apart from the town of Ozimek, Gmina Ozimek contains the villages and settlements of Antoniów, Biestrzynnik, Chobie, Dylaki, Grodziec, Jedlice, Krasiejów, Krzyżowa Dolina, Mnichus, Nowa Schodnia, Pustków, Schodnia and Szczedrzyk.

Neighbouring gminas
Gmina Ozimek is bordered by the gminas of Chrząstowice, Dobrodzień, Izbicko, Kolonowskie, Strzelce Opolskie, Turawa and Zębowice.

Twin towns – sister cities

Gmina Ozimek is twinned with:
 Heinsberg, Germany
 Krompachy, Slovakia
 Přerov, Czech Republic
 Rýmařov, Czech Republic

References

Ozimek
Opole County